Malem-Hodar Arrondissement  is an arrondissement of the Kaffrine Department in the Kaffrine Region of Senegal.

Subdivisions
The arrondissement is divided administratively into rural communities and in turn into villages.

Arrondissements of Senegal
Kaffrine Region